The 2015 BFD Energy Challenger was a professional tennis tournament played on clay courts. It was the first edition of the tournament which was part of the 2015 ATP Challenger Tour. It took place in Rome, Italy between 28 September and 4 October 2015.

Singles main-draw entrants

Seeds

 1 Rankings are as of September 21, 2015.

Other entrants
The following players received wild cards into the singles main draw:
  Giulio Di Meo
  Gianluca Mager
  Flavio Cipolla
  Matteo Berrettini

The following player received entry into the singles main draw using a protected ranking:
  Javier Martí

The following player received entry into the singles main draw as a special exempt:
  Miljan Zekić

The following players received entry from the qualifying draw:
  Lorenzo Giustino
  Alessandro Giannessi
  Stefanos Tsitsipas
  Riccardo Bonadio

Champions

Singles

  Federico Delbonis def.  Filip Krajinović, 1–6, 6–3, 6–4.

Doubles

  Tomasz Bednarek /  Mateusz Kowalczyk def.  Íñigo Cervantes /  Mark Vervoort, 6–2, 6–1.

References

2015 ATP Challenger Tour
2015 in Italian sport
September 2015 sports events in Italy
October 2015 sports events in Italy